The 1902 North Carolina A&M Aggies football team represented the North Carolina A&M Aggies of North Carolina College of Agriculture and Mechanic Arts during the 1902 college football season. In Art Devlin's first season as head coach, the Aggies improved to a 3–4–2 record, outscoring their opponents 91 to 41.

Schedule

References

North Carolina AandM
NC State Wolfpack football seasons
North Carolina AandM Aggies football